Wyn Belotte (born May 6, 1984) is a Canadian soccer player. who last played professionally for the Toronto Lynx in the USL First Division.

Career
At age 14 Belotte left Canada to train at Rennes and with the FC Nantes Atlantique youth system. He was signed by IFK Norrköping in 2002. In the 2003-04 season Belotte was signed by Polish giants Wisła Kraków, where he played in the reserve team.

In 2005, he returned to his native country and signed with the Toronto Lynx of the USL First Division. His signing was announced on June 21, 2005 along with newly acquired striker Said Ali, and league veteran Chris Williams.  He made his debut for the club on June 24, 2005 in a match against the Minnesota Thunder, where he recorded his first goal of the season with the club as well as registering an assist in a 2-1 victory. Belotte's contribution in the match marked the Lynx's first victory for the 2005 season. He would score his second of the season two weeks later in a 2-1 victory over the Seattle Sounders (1994–2008).

After the acquisition of Belotte the Lynx managed a 4-game undefeated streak, but unfortunately the Lynx performed poorly throughout the 2005 season by finishing last in the overall standings.

International career
Belotte played in 2003 FIFA World Youth Championship for Canada as well as appearing at the 2001 FIFA World Youth Championship.

Belotte played 2010 futsal at the QCSL World Cup.

Personal life
Both of his parents come from Haiti and his uncle André is former member of the Canada national under-16 soccer team.

References

External links
 

1984 births
Living people
Black Canadian soccer players
Canadian expatriate soccer players
Canadian expatriate sportspeople in France
Canadian expatriate sportspeople in Poland
Canadian expatriate sportspeople in Sweden
Canadian soccer players
Expatriate footballers in France
Expatriate footballers in Poland
Expatriate footballers in Sweden
Haitian Quebecers
Soccer players from Montreal
Allsvenskan players
Superettan players
Toronto Lynx players
USL First Division players
Canadian men's futsal players
Canada men's youth international soccer players
Canada men's under-23 international soccer players
IFK Norrköping players
Ängelholms FF players
Association football forwards